, occasionally abbreviated as Shinshūishū, a title which recollects the Shūi Wakashū, is the 19th imperial anthology of Japanese waka poetry. It was finished late in 1364 CE, a year after Emperor Go-Kōgon first ordered it in 1363 at the request of the Ashikaga Shōgun Ashikaga Yoshiakira. It was compiled by Fujiwara no Tameaki, a member of the older conservative Nijō house, who died in 1363 and was unable to complete his task; the priest Ton'a finished it. It consists of twenty volumes containing 1,920 poems.

References
pg. 486 of Japanese Court Poetry, Earl Miner, Robert H. Brower. 1961, Stanford University Press, LCCN 61-10925

Japanese poetry anthologies
Late Middle Japanese texts
1360s in Japan